No. 197 Squadron RAF was a Royal Air Force Squadron formed in World War I and reformed as a fighter-bomber unit in World War II.

History

Formation and World War I
No. 197 Squadron Royal Flying Corps was formed in Egypt on 9 August 1917, but it disbanded on 17 November 1917 upon re-designation as an artillery observation school, having not received any aircraft.

Reformation in World War II

The squadron reformed on 21 November 1942 at RAF Turnhouse and was supplied with Typhoons. It then operated from RAF Manston, RAF Tangmere and RAF Hurn. It supported the Normandy landings in June 1944 and re-located to France where it followed the Allied advance across Europe seeking targets of opportunity. It disbanded at Hildesheim, Germany, on 31 August 1945.

Aircraft operated

References

External links
 History of No.'s 196–200 Squadrons at RAF Web
 197 Squadron history on the official RAF website

197
Fighter squadrons of the Royal Air Force in World War II
Military units and formations established in 1917
1917 establishments in Egypt